Genesis 1:1 is the first verse of the first chapter of the Book of Genesis in the Hebrew and Christian Bibles and the opening of the Genesis creation narrative.

Text
The Hebrew is as follows:
 Vocalized: 
 Transliterated: Bereshit bara Elohim et hashamayim ve'et ha'aretz.

 Bereshit : "In [the] beginning [of something]". The definite article (i.e., the Hebrew equivalent of "the") is missing, but implied.
 bara: "[he] created/creating". The word is in the masculine singular form, so that "he" is implied; a peculiarity of this verb is that it used only of God.
 Elohim: the generic word for God, whether the God of Israel or the gods of other nations; it is used throughout Genesis 1, and contrasts with the phrase YHWH Elohim, "God YHWH", introduced in Genesis 2.
 et: a particle used in front of the direct object of a verb, in this case "the heavens and the earth", indicating that this is what is being "created". 
 Hashamayim ve'et ha'aretz: "the heavens and the earth"; this is a merism, a figure of speech indicating the two stand not for "heaven" and "earth" individually but "everything". the entire cosmos. 
 ha is the definite article, equivalent to the English word "the".
 ve is equivalent to English "and".

It can be translated into English in at least three ways:
 As a statement that the cosmos had an absolute beginning ("In the beginning, God created the heavens and earth").
 As a statement describing the world's condition when God began creating ("When in the beginning God created the heavens and the earth, the earth was untamed and shapeless").
 Taking all of Genesis 1:2 as background information ("When in the beginning God created the heavens and the earth, the earth being untamed and shapeless, God said, Let there be light!").

Analysis
Genesis 1:1 forms the basis for the Judeo-Christian doctrine of creation out of nothing (creatio ex nihilo), but most biblical scholars agree that on strictly linguistic and exegetical grounds, this is not the preferred option, and that the authors of Genesis 1, writing around 500–400 BCE, were concerned not with the origins of matter (the material which God formed into the habitable cosmos), but with the fixing of destinies.


See also

 Genesis 1:2
 Parashat Bereshit

References

Citations

Bibliography 

 
  
 
 
 
 
 

Genesis 1
Bereshit (parashah)
Hebrew Bible verses